Bracondale was a provincial electoral district in Toronto, Ontario, Canada. It was represented in the Legislative Assembly of Ontario from  1926 to 1967. The constituency got its name from an old Toronto suburb called Bracondale, that was annexed by Toronto in 1909. Its most notable event was electing one of the first two women Members of the Provincial Parliament (MPP) to share the title "first-woman MPP" in 1943 when Rae Luckock was elected. In 1965, Bracondale's MPP, Joseph Gould, died in office sparking the final election held in the constituency. George Ben won the by-election, and became the constituency's last MPP.  It was abolished for the 1967 Ontario provincial election, and redistributed into the Dovercourt and Bellwoods constituencies. As of 2022, the current electoral districts of Davenport, St. Paul's,  University–Rosedale, and  Spadina–Fort York encompass this historic riding.

History
Bracondale was the name of a former Toronto suburb that was annexed by the city in 1909; and north of Davenport Road, constituted the northern part of what eventually became the provincial electoral district. It was part of the northwestern expansion of the city that included Wychwood Park, and the City of West Toronto (now known as The Junction). The constituency was first contested during Ontario's 17th general election on 1 December 1926. Arthur Russell Nesbitt, was elected its first  Member of the Legislative Assembly (MLA). He was a member of  Ontario Conservative Party. 
The constituency's first Ontario Liberal MLA was Lionel Conacher, a famous Canadian athlete that retired from the National Hockey League to start a career in politics. He was elected on 6 October 1937 in a very close race with the constituency's incumbent MLA, Nesbitt. Nesbitt claimed that two ballot boxes were missing and one was filled with fraudulent ballots.  The constituency's returning officer was arrested, and denied bail because he had a quantity of ballots stuffed in his pockets.  Soon after Conacher was elected as an MLA, the legislature changed the designation for its members to Member of Provincial Parliament (MPP) in 1938.

Bracondale's most notable event came in 1943. Its residents elected Rae Luckock, one of two Co-operative Commonwealth Federation (CCF) female MPPs to share the title "first-female MPP"; the other was Agnes Macphail in York East. Luckock lost the 4 June 1945 provincial election to Conservative Harry Hyland Hyndman, which saw the Conservatives sweep into a majority government, by gaining most of the extra seats from the CCF.

Boundaries

1926 to 1934 boundaries

Bracondale was a long and narrow constituency, ranging from the Canadian National Exhibition Grounds in the south to the city limits at St. Clair Avenue in the north, in Toronto's west-end. It included parts of the present-day neighbourhoods of Bracondale Hill, Davenport, Dovercourt Park, Dufferin Grove, Little Portugal, and Liberty Village. Its southern boundary was Lake Ontario. Its eastern boundary started on the west side of Strachan Avenue. It went north on Strachan to Queen Street West and jogged westward along Queen's south side to Crawford Avenue. It then went north on Crawford's west side until Dundas Street West, where it went eastward along the northern section of Dundas to Beatrice Street. It went north on Beatrice's west side straight through to Bloor Street West. It then went along Christie to the northern boundary, the city limits just north of St. Clair Avenue West. It jogged westward along the city limits to Oakwood Avenue. It then went south along Oakwood's eastside to Davenport Road. It then went south on Dovercourt's east-side to Atlantic Avenue. On Atlantic's east-side to Lake Ontario.

1934 to 1967 Boundaries

It included parts of the present-day neighbourhoods that belong to Bracondale Hill, Davenport, Dovercourt Park, Dufferin Grove, Little Portugal, and Liberty Village. Its southern boundary was Lake Ontario. Its eastern boundary started on the west-side of Strachan Avenue. It went north on Strachan to Queen Street West and jogged westward along Queen's south side to Crawford Avenue. It then went north on Crawford's westside until Bloor Street West. It then went along Christie to the northern boundary, the city limits just north of St. Clair Avenue West. It jogged westward along the city limits to Oakwood Avenue. It then went south along Oakwood's eastside to Davenport Road. It then went south on Dovercourt's east-side to Atlantic Avenue. On Atlantic's east-side to Lake Ontario.

In 2012, the historic boundaries are approximately part of the south-east portion of the present-day Davenport constituency, a portion of the southern section of St. Paul's constituency, and most of the western portion of the Trinity–Spadina constituency.

Members of Provincial Parliament

Election results

1920s

1930s

1940s

1950s

1960s

References

Former provincial electoral districts of Ontario
Provincial electoral districts of Toronto